The Extraordinary and Plenipotentiary Ambassador of Peru to the Dominican Republic is the official representative of the Republic of Peru to the Dominican Republic.

The ambassador in Santo Domingo is also accredited to Haiti.

Both countries established relations on April 6, 1874, and have maintained them since.

List of representatives

References

Dominican Republic
Peru